David Ralph (born 17 August 1972) in Glasgow, Scotland is a former international hockey player who played as a forward for Scotland. 
He earned his first cap in 1993 and played club hockey for Loughborough Students' Hockey Club.

Ralph, an experienced international hockey coach was appointed Head Coach for the England and Great Britain women's hockey teams in September 2021.

He has previously been Assistant Head Coach for the England women's national field hockey team and Great Britain women's national field hockey team and the England men's national field hockey team and Great Britain men's national field hockey team.

His first coaching position was held at Brentwood Hockey Club, Essex before moving onto become head coach for Loughborough Students.

References

sportscotland

1972 births
Living people
Scottish male field hockey players
Scottish field hockey coaches
Field hockey players at the 2006 Commonwealth Games
Field hockey players from Glasgow
Loughborough Students field hockey players
Commonwealth Games competitors for Scotland